Star Highs, is an album by saxophonist Warne Marsh which was recorded in 1982 and released on the Dutch Criss Cross Jazz label.

Reception 

The Allmusic review states "Tenor saxophonist Warne Marsh and pianist Hank Jones had not performed together before they met up in the studio ... plenty of sparks fly between the two lead soloists. Marsh plays with more fire than one would expect from the cool-toned tenor; the material is fresher than usual, and the album can be easily recommended to straight-ahead jazz collectors".

Track listing 
All compositions by Warne Marsh except where noted
 "Switchboard Joe" – 5:54
 "Star Highs" – 7:51
 "Hank's Tune" (Hank Jones) – 5:39
 "Moose the Mooche" (Charlie Parker) – 5:53
 "Victory Ball" (Lennie Tristano) – 4:55
 "Sometimes" – 9:52
 "One for the Band" – 6:25
 "Switchboard Joe" [take 1] – 5:02 Bonus track on CD reissue
 "Sometimes" [take 1] – 6:07 Bonus track on CD reissue
 "Star Highs" [take 1] – 6:44 Bonus track on CD reissue

Personnel 
Warne Marsh – tenor saxophone
Hank Jones – piano
George Mraz – double bass|bass
Mel Lewis – drums

Production
 Gerry Teekens – producer 
 Max Bolleman – engineer

References 

Warne Marsh albums
1982 albums
Criss Cross Jazz albums